Marina Eugenia Jacoby Santos (born August 3, 1995) is a Nicaraguan model and beauty pageant titleholder who was crowned Miss Nicaragua 2016. She represented her Nicaragua at the Miss Universe 2016 pageant.

Personal life
Jacoby works as a model.
She currently lives in Los Angeles, California. In 2020, she dated American actor Blaine Kern III.

Miss Nicaragua 2016
Jacoby has said that as Miss Nicaragua she will be involved in initiatives to eradicate harassment, whether physical, verbal or cyber bullying . “Your best recipe for this type of attack has been to ignore them and turn the page.”I want to make kids raise their self-esteem so they can develop their potential."

Jacoby won the title of Miss Nicaragua 2016 on March 5, 2016. She was crowned by her predecessor, Daniela Torres of Managua.

As Miss Nicaragua 2016, Jacoby competed at the Miss Universe 2016 pageant but Unplaced.

References

External links
Official Miss Nicaragua website
La Prensa - Nicaraguan News Paper 
El Nuevo Diario - Nicaraguan News Paper 

1995 births
Living people
Nicaraguan beauty pageant winners
Miss Universe 2016 contestants
Nicaraguan female models